South African Journal of Philosophy (SAJP) is a quarterly peer-reviewed philosophy journal published by Taylor & Francis Online on behalf of the Philosophical Society of South Africa. It is indexed in the Thomson Reuters Arts and Humanities Index.

References

External links
Journal Homepage

Philosophy journals
Publications established in 1981
Academic journals published in South Africa